Josep Torrellas (Montblanc, 1963) is Professor and Willett Faculty Scholar in the Department of Computer Science and a research faculty for the Universal Parallel Computing Research Center at the University of Illinois at Urbana-Champaign. Torrellas's research area is computer architecture, focusing on speculative multithreading, multiprocessor organization, integration of processors and memory, and architectural support for software debuggability and machine reliability. He has been involved in the Stanford DASH and the Illinois Cedar multiprocessor projects, and led the Illinois Aggressive COMA and FlexRAM Intelligent Memory projects.

Torrellas has contributed to many NSF, DARPA and DOE funding initiatives. The Aggressive COMA research project was selected as one of the "Eight Point-Design Studies" that DARPA, NSF, NSA and NASA supported in the mid-nineties in a nationwide effort to accelerate the arrival of a petascale machine. He has received as lead PI several multimillion-dollar NSF grants, and is the lead PI of two medium ITR grants. He has directed projects in several DARPA initiatives, including the recent "Polymorphous Computer Architectures" (PCA), and "High Productivity Computing Systems" (HPCS). In the HPCS program, he is playing a leading role in helping define the architecture of IBM's PERCS multiprocessor (POWER7). He is also involved in DOE's Extreme Scale Computation initiative.

Torrellas has been at the University of Illinois since receiving his PhD in Electrical Engineering from Stanford University in 1992. He also spent a sabbatical year as Research Staff Member at IBM's T.J. Watson Research Center. Torrellas is an IEEE and ACM Fellow and member of the National Computational Science Alliance (NCSA) and the DOE Illinois Center for the Simulation of Advanced Rockets (CSAR). He is currently the Chairman of IEEE Technical Committee on Computer Architecture (TCCA), an Associate Editor of the ACM Transactions on Architecture and Code Optimization (TACO), and a Member of the Advisory Board of the ECE Department, University of Rochester. He previously served as Vice-Chairman and Member of the Advisory Board of IEEE TCCA from 1998 to 2005. Torrellas has received an NSF Young Investigator Award, an NSF RIA, and an IBM Partnership Award.

Current Research Affiliations
 Universal Parallel Computing Research Center (UPCRC) at Illinois
 i-acoma Architecture Group at the University of Illinois
 Illinois OpenSPARC Center

External links
 Josep Torrellas's Homepage
 Parallel Computing Research at Illinois: The UPCRC Agenda
 Parallel@Illinois
 Illinois Department of Computer Science

References

University of Illinois Urbana-Champaign faculty
Fellow Members of the IEEE
IBM employees
Living people
Fellows of the Association for Computing Machinery
1963 births